is a Japanese football player who last played for Sukhothai in the Thai League 1.

Club stats
Updated to 2 July 2022.

References

External links
Profile at Ventforet Kofu

Profile at Omiya Ardija

1990 births
Living people
Association football people from Saitama Prefecture
Japanese footballers
J1 League players
J2 League players
Omiya Ardija players
FC Gifu players
Giravanz Kitakyushu players
Ventforet Kofu players
Ryohei Arai
Ryohei Arai
Association football midfielders